Breda Holmes is a former camogie player, winner of the B+I Star of the Year award in 1987 and seven All Ireland medals in succession between 1984 and 1991, celebrating the seventh by scoring the match-turning goal from Ann Downey’s sideline ball against Cork in the 1991 final.

Career
She captained Carysfort Training College in their 1984 Purcell Cup campaign and won six All Ireland club medals with St Paul’s camogie club, based in Kilkenny city.

References

Living people
Kilkenny camogie players
Year of birth missing (living people)